Johann Franz Adolph Hoffmann (23 March 1858 – 1 December 1930) was a German socialist politician and Prussian Minister for Science, Culture and Education.

Born in Berlin, Hoffmann worked as an engraver, and then as a gilder.  He joined the Social Democratic Party of Germany, and from 1890 was the editor of local socialist newspapers, then in 1893 became a book dealer and publisher. He was known for his opposition to the ways in which Christianity was practiced by the wealthy and his advocacy for a radial separation of church and state, for this he was nicknamed "Ten Commandments Hoffmann" as a result.

In 1900, Hoffmann was elected to Berlin City Council, in 1904 to the Reichstag, and in 1908 to the Prussian Diet. In 1915, Hoffmann represented together with Georg Ledebour the German pacifist socialists at the Zimmerwald conference.  In 1916, he was elected as chair of the Berlin SPD, but he opposed World War I and so joined the Independent Social Democratic Party of Germany (USPD) split, becoming its chair, until 1918. 

During the November Revolution, Hoffmann together with Konrad Haenisch became Prussian Minister of Science, Art and Popular Education for a few months. During this time he tried to abolish school inspection in Prussia by the Churches and agitated for the separation of Church, school and state. His strongly anticlerical remarks he made in office helped mobilize the Catholic electorate, who feared a new Kulturkampf. After the events of the Spartacus Uprising, Hoffmann left his post as education minister. 

In 1920, he was re-elected to the Reichstag, and he became co-chair of its left-wing faction, which he led into the Communist Party of Germany (KPD).  He was elected to the KPD's central committee, but resigned in 1921 in sympathy with Paul Levi.  He followed Levi into the Communist Working Group, the USPD, and then the SPD. Hoffman continued his work with the KPD-backed Workers International Relief. In 1926 he spoke out in favor of the expropriation of the princes. He lost his seat in the Reichstag in 1924, and stood down from the city council in 1928.

From 1928 until his death, he was a member of the Prussian state parliament.

References

1858 births
1930 deaths
Communist Party of Germany politicians
German trade unionists
Independent Social Democratic Party politicians
Members of the Reichstag of the Weimar Republic
Social Democratic Party of Germany politicians
Education ministers of Prussia